Leucomeris decora is a species of flowering plant in the family Asteraceae.

Description
The plant is native to Southeast Asia. It is found in Myanmar, Thailand, Vietnam, and Yunnan province of southern China.

The small composite tree grows in hot dry valleys.

Conservation
Leucomeris decora is on the IUCN Red List. Threats include local exploitation of the wood for fuel and the bark for medicine.

References

 IUCN Red List of all Threatened Species

decora
Flora of Myanmar
Flora of Thailand
Flora of Vietnam
Flora of Yunnan
Trees of China
Trees of Indo-China
Data deficient plants
Taxonomy articles created by Polbot